Martinis & Bikinis is the seventh studio album by American singer and songwriter Sam Phillips. It was released on March 8, 1994 and re-released on July 17, 2012. "Circle of Fire" was nominated for Best Female Rock Vocal Performance at the 37th Annual Grammy Awards.

The photographs included in this album's artwork reportedly led to Phillips' role as a mute terrorist in the film Die Hard with a Vengeance.

Track listing

Personnel
 Sam Phillips
 T Bone Burnett
 Mickey Curry
 David Mansfield
 Jerry Scheff

Guests
 Michael Blair
 Peter Buck
 Marvin Etzioni
 Don Heffington
 Van Dyke Parks
 Marc Ribot
 Larry Taylor
 Benmont Tench
 Sid Page Strings

Charts

References

1994 albums
Sam Phillips (musician) albums
Albums produced by T Bone Burnett
Virgin Records albums